Tenniel may refer to:

Places
Mount Tenniel, a mountain in Antarctica

People with the name
 Sir John Tenniel (1820–1914), Victorian illustrator famous for his illustrations of Lewis Carroll's work
 Tenniel Evans (1926–2009), Welsh actor